Cratypedes neglectus, the pronotal range grasshopper, is a species of band-winged grasshopper in the family Acrididae. It is found in North America. It feeds on sagebrush.

References

External links

 

Oedipodinae
Articles created by Qbugbot
Insects described in 1870